Tora Prison is an Egyptian prison complex for criminal and political detainees, located in Tora, Egypt. The complex is situated in front of the Tora El Balad metro station. The main buildings in the Tora Prison complex are Tora Agricultural Prison, Tora Liman (maximum security), Tora Istiqbal (reception), Tora El Mahkoum and Tora Supermax prison, also known as Scorpion Prison.

History
Tora Agricultural Prison was established in 1928 by Wafdist Interior Minister Mostafa El-Nahas while he was the interior minister, in an effort to ease overcrowding at Abu Zaabal Prison.

On 1 June 1957, security guards at Tora Prison killed 21 Muslim Brotherhood in Egypt prisoners.

Architecture
Tora prison consists of seven blocks each holding approximately 350 prisoners, and are divided into sections such as political prisoners and criminals according to the severity of their crimes. There is a block for police officers and judges imprisoned on bribery charges, and a disciplinary block consisting of seven solitary confinement cells, two meters squared in size and some without light or ventilation.
The prison walls are seven metres tall and are monitored by CCTV. The different sections of the prison are walled off from each other. After three prisoners from the Egyptian Islamic Jihad organization implicated in the assassination of Anwar Sadat escaped in 1988, 2.5 meters were added to walls.
Tora Prison has a small hospital overlooking a garden which is the block where businessmen and members of the Mubarak regime are held for corruption cases. The hospital is next to a football pitch and to a tennis court where the prisoners exercise. 
The prison has held some of Egypt's most high-profile prisoners. Some cells for long-term inmates are reminiscent of typical, if cramped, apartments (i.e. including a kitchenette, etc.).

In 2014, a maximum security wing was built to hold political prisoners, whose numbers had started increasing since the July 2013 removal of Mohamed Morsi from office.

Torture
Welcome parades, a technique used in Egyptian prisons in which new prisoners are physically and psychologically abused while crawling between two lines of policemen, was used in Tora Prison in September 2019 during the 2019 Egyptian protests, when blogger Alaa Abd el-Fattah and his lawyer Mohamed el-Baqer of the Adalah Center for Rights and Freedoms were subjected to welcome parades following their 29 September arrests.

There have been allegations that the prison was used for other forms of torture and that there was Mukhabarat (Egyptian intelligence services) complicity with CIA extraordinary rendition practices during the Mubarak presidency. Tora Prison may have operated in this capacity since 1995/96  (being the most accessible of the few liman, i.e. maximum security prisons), making it one of the first of the black sites of George W. Bush's War on Terror.

In December 2020, a detailed report by the Human Rights Watch highlighted the extensive changes introduced by the Egyptian authorities inside the Scorpion Prison of the Tora Prison complex. As part of collectively punishing nearly 800 to 900 prisoners, each cell of the Scorpion Prison’s four H-shaped building were modified to block all sources of ventilation, light and electricity from the cells. The report based on a three-page letter and a 13-minute video smuggled out of the prison, and three sources, including a lawyer, explained how the restrictions were further severed to torture the political prisoners inside these cells.

Ramy Shaath, an outspoken Egyptian-Palestinian human rights defender was released from a two-and-a-half years’ long torturous detention in January 2022. Shaath became an easy target for the Egyptian authorities to arrest following his participation in the infamous 2011 pro-democracy protests in Egypt and his contribution to the foundation of the Egyptian branch of the boycott movement against Israel led by Palestinians. A vocal opponent of the Arab dictatorial system and the Israeli occupation over Palestinians, Shaath was subjected to torture, ill-treatment during his detention, detained in overcrowded prison cells, and forced to renounce his Egyptian citizenship to guarantee his release from the prison, despite wrongful detention.

Notable inmates
 Maajid Nawaz, an Islamist-radical turned counter-extremist from the UK. He was visited in Tora by his lawyer, the future London Mayor, Sadiq Khan.
 † Shukri Mustafa (1965−1967), executed by hanging.
 Wolfgang Lotz (The Champagne Spy) (1965-1968)
 Abd al-Hamid Kishk (1981-1982)
 Mustafa Amin
 Abbud al-Zumar (1981-2011)
 Kamal Khalil
 Muhammad Abdelrahim al-Sharqawi (3 years in the late 1980s)
 Azzam Azzam (1997-2004)
 Ahmad Ibrahim al-Sayyid al-Naggar (1999/2000 previous to his execution elsewhere)
 Muhammad al-Zawahiri (1999−?2011, tortured and beaten)
 Ashraf Shahin (early 2000s, reportedly tortured)
 Ihab Saqr (2002−2006 Istiqbal Tura, 2006−2008 Liman Tura, 2008-? Istiqbal Tura)
 Hassan Mustafa Osama Nasr (2003−?2007, reportedly tortured by electric shocks, beating and rape; see Abu Omar case)
 Ayman Nour (2005-2009)
 Hisham Talaat Moustafa (2008–present)
 Blogger Alaa Abd El-Fattah and dozens of other civil-rights activists (2006, presumably Istiqbal Tura)
 also in 2019 together with his lawyer Mohamed el-Baqer
 Alaa Mubarak and Gamal Mubarak (2011)
 Adel al-Gazzar (2011−?)
 Safwat El-Sherif
 Khairat el-Shater
 Zakaria Azmi
 Ahmed Ezz
 Ahmed Nazif
 Ahmed El Maghrabi
 Anas el-Fiqqi
 Habib el-Adly
 Tito Momen (sentenced for 15 years because he became a Mormon, released in 2006, went on to write a book titled "My name used to be Muhammad.")
 Sayyed Imam Al-Sharif (2004–present)
 Hosni Mubarak (2011-2013) incarcerated in April 2011, sentenced for life imprisonment in June 2012, but released in August 2013 after a court found that there were no legal grounds for his continued detention.
 Tarek Loubani and John Greyson, two Canadian citizens arrested in the 2013 Egyptian protests and held for 50 days without charges
 Mahmoud Abu Zeid, an Egyptian freelance photographer arrested during the August 2013 Rabaa massacre, detained for over two years and then charged
 Mohamed Soltan, human rights activist and civilian journalist, shot during a pro-democracy protest and then arrested without a warrant in his home 10 days later in August 2013. Mohamed is still imprisoned (as of March 28, 2015) in Tora Limon maximum security prison without charge or evidence presented against him. Much of his detention has been spent in solitary confinement, likely a punishment for his international popularity and a hunger strike which he began on January 26, 2014 to protest the inhumane conditions of the prison and the torture and unjustified detention of himself and hundreds of other human rights activists and journalists
 Mustafa Ahmed Hassan Hamza (2014–present)
 † Mohamed Morsi (2013 - 2019), deposed President of Egypt. Died in prison of a heart attack.
 † Essam el-Erian (2013 - 2020) Died in prison of a heart attack.
 Essam El-Haddad (2013–present)
 Gehad El-Haddad (2013–present)
 Mohamed Fahmy (2013 - 2015)
 Husam Abu al-Bukhari (2013–present)
 Ayman Nour (2013–present)
 Khaled al-Qazzaz (2014 - 2015)
 Ezzat Ghoniem (2018-present), whose release has been requested by European Parliament
 † Shady Habash (2018-2020)
 Patrick Zaki (2020-2021, reportedly tortured)

Unconfirmed:
 Ahmad Salama Mabruk (1999 − early 2000s?)
 Essam Marzouk (1999−?, reportedly tortured)
 Abu Ayyub al-Masri (1999−?, based on claim of Mamdouh Ismail and conflicts other reports)
 Mamdouh Habib (2001/02, reportedly tortured by electric shocks, hanging)
 Ahmed Agiza and Muhammad al-Zery (2002−2004, reportedly tortured and beaten)
 Ibn al-Shaykh al-Libi (2002−?2006, reportedly tortured by confinement in a tiny space and beatings)
Mustafa Ali Hassanien (February 2020,film-maker studying at CUNY College of Staten Island in the US)

References

External links
 Official website for the Egyptian Interior Ministry Prison Service

Helwan Governorate
Prisons in Egypt
1908 establishments in Egypt
Buildings and structures in Cairo